Fabian Messina (born 16 September 2002) is a professional footballer who plays as a midfielder for FSV Frankfurt. Born in Germany, he plays for the Dominican Republic national team.

Club career
Messina is a youth product of Hoffenheim. He transferred to Sonnenhof Großaspach in the Regionalliga on 13 July 2021, where he began his senior career.

International career
Born in Germany, Messina is of Italian and Dominican descent. He is a youth international for the Dominican Republic U23s, having represented them 3 times for the 2020 CONCACAF Men's Olympic Qualifying Championship. He debuted with the senior Dominican Republic national team in a 2–0 2022–23 CONCACAF Nations League B win over Belize on 2 June 2022.

References

External links
 
 DFB Profile
 

2002 births
Living people
Footballers from Stuttgart
Citizens of the Dominican Republic through descent
Dominican Republic footballers
Association football midfielders
Dominican Republic youth international footballers
Dominican Republic international footballers
Dominican Republic people of Italian descent
German footballers
SG Sonnenhof Großaspach players
Regionalliga players
German sportspeople of Italian descent
German people of Dominican Republic descent
Sportspeople of Dominican Republic descent